Just Dance: Disney Party 2 is a 2015 game in the Just Dance series published by Ubisoft. It is the sequel to Just Dance: Disney Party (a spin-off title of the Just Dance Kids series) and was released on October 20, 2015 for Wii, Wii U and Kinect for Xbox 360 and Xbox One. Unlike the previous game, Just Dance: Disney Party 2 only features songs from Disney Channel original movies and shows, which includes songs from Austin & Ally, Descendants, Teen Beach 2, Liv and Maddie, Violetta, Girl Meets World and many more.

Gameplay
The in-game portion is similar to that of the original Just Dance: Disney Party entry. The pictograms have been slightly edited to look like those in the Just Dance main series games, but all of them are colored purple. In the previous game, the players could choose a "costume" for own character that rates their dancing, even though none of the ratings are displayed. In this game, they choose a facial recreation of 15 Disney characters. Also, the "crown" sound byte has been altered.

Track list
25 songs are included in this track list.

References

2015 video games
Dance video games
Music video games
Fitness games
Ubisoft games
Just Dance (video game series)
Xbox 360 games
Xbox One games
Kinect games
Wii games
Wii U games
Wii U eShop games
Disney video games
Multiplayer and single-player video games
Video games developed in the United States